Calcutta was launched at Chester in 1817. She was a general trader and in her early years traded with India, sailing under a license from the British East India Company (EIC). She suffered a maritime mishap in 1833, but then traded for another 20+ years; she was last listed in 1857 with stale data.

Career
In 1813 the EIC had lost its monopoly on the trade between India and Britain. British ships were then free to sail to India or the Indian Ocean under a license from the EIC.

Calcutta first appeared in Lloyd's Register (LR) in 1818 with Stroyan, master, Gladstone, owner, and trade Liverpool–Calcutta.

On 14 October 1818, Calcutta, Stroyan, master, set sail from Liverpool for Bengal. That same evening Susan, bound for Trieste, ran into Calcutta, damaging her. Both vessels had to put back to Liverpool to effect repairs.

On 15 January 1833 the steam ship  towed into Waterford Calcutta, of Liverpool, Watson, master. Calcutta had left Liverpool for India but had lost her masts, boats, rudder, and anchor. Lloyd's List reported on 18 January 1833 that the chief mate and the carpenter had brought the wreck into Waterford.

Citations

References
 

1817 ships
Age of Sail merchant ships of England
Maritime incidents in 1817